Rubén Martín Pulido (born 2 February 1979) is a Spanish football manager and former player who played as a central defender. He is the current manager of CD Cazalegas.

He amassed La Liga totals of 97 matches and eight goals over five seasons, representing in the competition Getafe, Almería and Zaragoza. He finished his professional career in Greece.

Club career
Pulido was born in Madrid. After appearing for modest UB Conquense and Getafe CF, the latter then in the third division, the Real Madrid youth graduate spent one second level season each with Rayo Vallecano and Sporting de Gijón.

Pulido returned to Getafe in the summer of 2004, helping the capital side retain their recently achieved top-level status. However, he was never an undisputed starter during his three years with the club, with a best output of 25 La Liga games in his second.

In July 2008, Pulido joined top flight newcomers UD Almería, and was one of the Andalusia team's most important players during his first year scoring three league goals, including the only in a 20 January 2008 home win over Deportivo de La Coruña and another in a 2–2 home draw to FC Barcelona on 16 March.

After just one season with Almería – he had signed a two-year deal – Pulido joined Real Zaragoza, freshly relegated to the second level. He contributed with 23 matches as the Aragonese were immediately promoted.

Pulido played roughly the same number of games in the 2009–10 campaign, netting against former club Almería (2–1 home win) and Villarreal CF (3–3 home draw), and appearing inclusively as right-back; in the following off-season, the 31-year-old did not see his contract renewed and signed with Greek team Asteras Tripolis FC.

References

External links

1979 births
Living people
Footballers from Madrid
Spanish footballers
Association football defenders
La Liga players
Segunda División players
Segunda División B players
Real Madrid C footballers
UB Conquense footballers
Getafe CF footballers
Sporting de Gijón players
Rayo Vallecano players
UD Almería players
Real Zaragoza players
Super League Greece players
Asteras Tripolis F.C. players
Aris Thessaloniki F.C. players
Spanish expatriate footballers
Expatriate footballers in Greece
Spanish expatriate sportspeople in Greece
Spanish football managers